Tabrizaq (also Romanized as Tabrīzaq; also known as Tabrīzak, Tarbezaq, Tarbizek, Tardīzak, and Tareh Tīzak) is a village in Sanjabad-e Gharbi Rural District, in the Central District of Kowsar County, Ardabil Province, Iran. At the 2006 census, its population was 96, in 22 families.

References 

Tageo

Towns and villages in Kowsar County